Moore-Manning House is a historic home located at Pittsboro, Chatham County, North Carolina.  It was built in the 1830s, and is a two-story, three bay, Federal style frame dwelling with a hipped roof. The house was renovated in 1858 and a two-story wing added.

It was listed on the National Register of Historic Places in 1982.  It is located in the Pittsboro Historic District.

References

Houses on the National Register of Historic Places in North Carolina
Federal architecture in North Carolina
Houses in Chatham County, North Carolina
National Register of Historic Places in Chatham County, North Carolina
Pittsboro, North Carolina
Individually listed contributing properties to historic districts on the National Register in North Carolina